Haley Bugeja (born 5 May 2004) is a Maltese professional footballer who plays as a forward for Orlando Pride of the National Women's Soccer League (NWSL) and the Malta women's national team.

Club career

Mġarr United
Bugeja made her senior club debut at the age of 14 for Maltese Women's League club Mġarr United during the 2018–19 season. She finished the season as the league's top scorer with 26 goals and was named the league's Player of the Year at the Malta FA awards. Bugeja retained her player of the year title the following season although, despite matching her 26 goal total from the previous season, was beaten to the golden boot by Loza Abera of Birkirkara who scored 30. Mġarr United finished second to Birkirkara in the league both seasons.

Sassuolo
In July 2020, Bugeja signed a thee-year deal with Italian Serie A club Sassuolo. She made her debut for the club on 5 September 2020, at the age of 16, in Sassuolo's 3–1 win against Napoli. Bugeja scored the first and third goal for her team.

Orlando Pride
On 1 July 2022, it was announced Bugeja had signed for Orlando Pride of the National Women's Soccer League (NWSL) through the end of the 2023 season.

International career
Bugeja won her first senior cap for Malta as a 14-year-old in April 2019, starting a 2–0 friendly defeat by Romania in Bucharest. She scored her first goal in a 2–1 home friendly defeat by Turkey in January 2020. A first competitive goal arrived in March 2020, in a 2–1 home UEFA Women's Euro 2022 qualifying Group B win over Georgia. In November 2020 Bugeja scored a hat-trick in Malta's 4–0 win over the same opponents away from home.

Career statistics

Club
.

International
Statistics accurate as of match played 20 February 2023.

International goals
 As of match played 17 February 2023. Malta score listed first, score column indicates score after each Bugeja goal.

Honours
Malta FA Women's League Player of the Year: 2018–19, 2019–20
Maltese Women's League top goalscorer: 2018–19

See also
List of Malta women's international footballers

References

2004 births
Living people
Women's association football forwards
Maltese women's footballers
Malta women's international footballers
Malta women's youth international footballers
Maltese expatriate sportspeople in Italy
Expatriate women's footballers in Italy
U.S. Sassuolo Calcio (women) players
Serie A (women's football) players
Orlando Pride players
National Women's Soccer League players
Maltese expatriate sportspeople in the United States
Expatriate women's soccer players in the United States